The black seabream (Spondyliosoma cantharus) is a species of Sparidae fishes. They are recognisable by their oval compressed body and jaws containing 4-6 rows of slender teeth which are larger at the front. They are silvery in colour with blue and pink tinges and broken longitudinal gold lines. They can reach a maximum size of 60 cm in length.
They live in northern Europe and in the Mediterranean, usually found on the inshore shelf at depths varying from 5 to 300 m. They are usually found in schools feeding on seaweeds and invertebrates. They breed in February to May leaving eggs in the demersal zone.

Black seabream are protogynous meaning females have the ability to change to males.

References

External links

 Page at Fish Base 

black seabream
Fish of Africa
Fish of Europe
Fauna of Macaronesia
Fish of the Mediterranean Sea
black seabream
Taxa named by Carl Linnaeus